Alfred Stanley Williams (1 May 1919 – 12 June 2007) was a South African football player. Williams played for Aberdeen, Plymouth Argyle and Dundee. He scored the winning goal for Aberdeen in the 1947 Scottish Cup Final, and also appeared in the Scottish League Cup Final during the same season.

References

External links 

Greens on Screen profile
London Hearts profile

1919 births
2007 deaths
South African soccer players
Association football wingers
Aberdeen F.C. players
Plymouth Argyle F.C. players
Dundee F.C. players
Scottish Football League players
English Football League players
Dumbarton F.C. wartime guest players
Clyde F.C. wartime guest players
Scotland wartime international footballers
South African expatriate sportspeople in Scotland
South African expatriate soccer players
Expatriate footballers in Scotland
White South African people
Stoke City F.C. wartime guest players